James Staiano is the executive chef of the Madison Room and Bar at the New York Palace Hotel in New York City, where he has worked for 24 years. Under Staiano's culinary leadership, the Madison Room has received two Michelin stars. In the late 1990s Staiano created the menu for Istana, a pan-Mediterranean restaurant in the same location. He has also worked at the Helmsley Palace.

See also
List of Michelin starred restaurants

References

External links
The Madison Room & Bar

Living people
American chefs
American male chefs
Head chefs of Michelin starred restaurants
Year of birth missing (living people)